Sean Richard O'Pry (born July 5, 1989) is an American model from Kennesaw, Georgia.

Early life
O'Pry reports having Irish and unspecified Native American heritage. He has an elder brother and a younger sister. He attended North Cobb High School. He played track and field, basketball, baseball, and football in high school.

Career 
In 2006, 17-year-old O'Pry was scouted from his prom photos on MySpace.

Since then, O'Pry has been featured in numerous advertising campaigns and editorials for  Calvin Klein, Giorgio Armani, Versace, Dolce & Gabbana, Ralph Lauren, Gianfranco Ferré, H&M, Massimo Dutti, Zara, Armani Jeans, Marc Jacobs, Emporio Armani, Lacoste, DSquared², American Eagle, Bottega Veneta, DKNY, Fendi, GQ, Dazed & Confused, V, Details, Barneys, Uniqlo, Bloomingdale's, Belstaff, D2, Arena, Diesel, Gap, JOOP! and Numéro Homme.

His runway credentials include opening Versace, Yves Saint Laurent, Givenchy and Salvatore Ferragamo,  closing Moschino, Trussardi and Zegna, and both for Balmain. Other designers he has walked for include Roberto Cavalli, Louis Vuitton, Chanel, Michael Kors, and Hermès. In November 2011, O'Pry was selected as the star of Viktor & Rolf's Spicebomb fragrance campaign.

O'Pry appeared in Madonna's music video "Girl Gone Wild". He also appeared in Taylor Swift's music video for her song "Blank Space", as her love interest.

Achievements
In 2008, O'Pry was named the world's eighth most successful male model by Forbes magazine. Only one year later, he had moved up to the #1 position on their list. As of September 2013, Models.com named O'Pry as the most successful male model in the world on their 'Top 50' list. As of 2014, he had held that position for two years.

In 2015, O'Pry was included on Models.com's new 'Supers Men', 'Sexiest Men', and the 'Money Guys' lists. That same year, Vogue, ranked him fifth on the 'Top 10 Male Models of All Time'.

References

External links

 Sean O'Pry at TheFashionisto.com
 
 
 

1989 births
Male models from Georgia (U.S. state)
Living people
People from Kennesaw, Georgia
American people of Irish descent
American people who self-identify as being of Native American descent
Male models